Jock Jams, Volume 5 is the fifth album in the Jock Jams compilation album series.

Track listing
"Can You Feel It!" - Van Earl Wright
"Reach Up" - Perfecto All-Stars
"We Like to Party" - Vengaboys
"Ray of Light" - Madonna
"Miami" - Will Smith
"Turn It Up (Remix)/Fire It Up" - Busta Rhymes
"We Came to Play!" - The Jock Jams Cheerleaders
"I'm Gonna Get You" - Bizarre Inc.
"Nice and Slow" (Remix) - Usher
"Woof Woof" - 69 Boyz
"Mexican Hat Dance" - Ray Castoldi
"Nobody's Supposed to Be Here" (Remix) - Deborah Cox
"Feel It" - Tamperer featuring Maya
"Deep to Right Field!" - Van Earl Wright
"Too Close" (Remix) – Next
"Suavemente" (Remix) – Elvis Crespo
"You Ugly" – The Jock Jams Cheerleaders
"Burnin' Up" – Cevin Fisher
"All I Have to Give" (Remix) – Backstreet Boys
"Got to Be Real" – Cheryl Lynn
"Hit the Showers" – Van Earl Wright

Charts

References

Jock series
1999 compilation albums
Dance music compilation albums
Rhythm and blues compilation albums
Tommy Boy Records compilation albums